Abramo is a surname. People with this surname include:

 Cláudio Abramo (1923–1987), Italian-Brazilian journalist
 Jericó Abramo Masso (born 1975), Mexican politician
 Lélia Abramo (1911–2004), Italian-Brazilian actress
 Livio Abramo (1903–1993), Brazilian-Paraguayan engraver
 Perseu Abramo (1929–1996), Brazilian journalist
 Philip Abramo (born 1945), Italian-American mobster
 Sergio Abramo (born 1958), Italian politician

See also
Abramo (given name)

References 

de:Abramo
es:Abramo
it:Abramo (disambigua)